Art and Aviation is an album by American saxophonist Jane Ira Bloom that was recorded in 1992 and released on the Arabesque label.

Reception

The AllMusic review by David R. Adler said: "Art & Aviation is not only one of Jane Ira Bloom's finest albums, it is also a remarkably successful (and fairly early) attempt to bring electronic influences to bear on acoustic jazz. Bloom's writing is strongly infused with a straight-ahead jazz aesthetic. But she veers left on many cuts, altering her soprano sax sound with live electronics ... While most tracks still sound very much like jazz, the electronics, while never becoming obtrusive, give everything an unpredictable edge ... The complex, angular soprano/trumpet unison lines heard on many of the pieces call to mind the harmonically free sound of Ornette Coleman's early recordings with Don Cherry. ... But Bloom is not copying Coleman at all; rather, just as Coleman did, she is pushing jazz into new, similarly controversial areas, without sacrificing musicality for a second." Jeff Simon of The Buffalo News noted: " Certainly, she is among the precious few to marry jazz and the sonorities of classical new music with total lack of affectation."

Track listing
All compositions by Jane Ira Bloom, except where noted
 "Gateway to Progress" – 5:26
 "Further into the Night" – 6:48
 "Hawkins' Parallel Universe" – 6:51
 "Straight, No Chaser / Miro" (Thelonious Monk / Bloom) – 5:45
 "Oshumare" – 8:00
 "Art & Aviation" – 7:12
 "Most Distant Galaxy" – 8:09
 "I Believe Anita" – 5:56
 "Lost in the Stars" (Kurt Weill, Maxwell Anderson) – 3:51

Personnel
Jane Ira Bloom – soprano saxophone, live electronics
Kenny Wheeler – flugelhorn, trumpet (tracks 1, 2, 4-6 & 8)
Ron Horton – trumpet (tracks 2-4)
Kenny Werner – piano (tracks 2 & 5)
Michael Formanek – bass (tracks 1, 3, 6 & 8)
Rufus Reid – bass (tracks 2, 4, 5 & 7)
Jerry Granelli – drums, elektro-acoustic percussion (tracks 1-8)

References

External links

1992 albums
Arabesque Records albums
Jane Ira Bloom albums